Macizo de la Maladeta is the highest mountain range and the first glacial massif in the Pyrenees. It is located in the Spanish province of Huesca (Aragon). To the north is the head of the Benasque Valley, and to the south the Vallibierna Valley descends.

Toponomy
The name Maladeta was known at the start of the 18th century and the legend of the curse was already very strong.

The latest studies (published in 1989 and 2009) indicate an Aragonese word, uncertainly related to the Latin  ("cursed") but the association of the preindo-European (and precelte) root  ("high rocky mountain") at the root  (advanced by P. Fouché and A. Dauzat) remains doubtful.

See also
Mountains of Aragon

References

Sources
 Carte générale des Monts Pyrénées dite Carte de Roussel 1716-1719 indiquant « Montagne de Maladete » ; Jean Escudier, L'Aneto et les hommes, MonHélios, 2012, page 6

External links

Mountain ranges of Aragon